The Barcelona–Cerbère railway is a  railway line linking Barcelona in Catalonia, Spain to Cerbère in France. It is served by the Rodalies de Catalunya commuter network,[Renfe]] regional, MD, AVE, Avlo and Avant train services, and TGV trains. The line stars at Barcelona Sants railway station, and passes through the Catalan regional cities of Girona and Figueres before reaching the French border, and then  Cerbère, just across the border. It is an important commuter and High Speed line, connecting Paris, Montpellier and Perpinyà to Spain.

History
It was built between 1858 and 1878 and electrified between 1981 and 1982 . It used to start at the Estació de França in Barcelona, but now starts at the Sants station.

Major Stations Along The Railway
Barcelona Sants railway station

Plaça De Catalunya railway station

Arc De Triomf Railway Station

El Clot-Aragó Railway Station

Sant Andreu Comtal Railway Station

Granollers Centre Railway Station

Girona Railway Station

Figueres Railway Station

Portbou Railway Station

Cerbère Railway Station

Gallery

Notes

See also 
 Perpignan–Barcelona high-speed rail line

References

External links

 Adif. Official website of the railway's owner

Iberian gauge railways
Railway lines in Catalonia
Railway lines opened in 1854
Railway lines in Spain
Transport in Alt Empordà
Transport in Baix Empordà
Transport in Figueres
Transport in Girona
Transport in Gironès
Rail transport in Barcelona
Transport in Montcada i Reixac
Transport in Selva
Transport in Vallès Oriental
1854 establishments in Europe